Symplocaceae is a family of flowering plants in the order Ericales, including two genera, Symplocos and Cordyloblaste, totalling about 260 known species. The common name for Symplocaceae is sweetleaf. Symplocaceae has a transpacific distribution that covers the Southeast United States, South America, Southeast Asia and Northern Australia. Plants in the family Symplocaceae are generally trees or shrubs, and are found in humid, tropical, montane forests within their range.

Description
The leaves of Symplocaceae are generally simple and are alternate or spirally arranged. The margin is either dentate, glandular-dentate, or entire. The petioles of the leaves lack stipules at the base.

The flowers of Symplocaceae appear as an inflorescence that is generally axillary but can occasionally be terminal. The inflorescence is a spike, raceme, compact cyme, or thyrsi-panicle. The petals occur in a multiple of three, five, or eleven, and there are three to five sepals. The petals are most often white, but in unusual circumstances maybe yellow.

The fruit of Symplocaceae is a dry drupe. It possesses a lignified endocarp or "stone" which often contains key information when distinguishing between closely related species of Symplocaceae. Symplocaceae endocarps are open at the apex with multiple chambers ranging in number from one to five but generally, three-chambered. These chambers hold seeds and protect them from damage. Most Symplocaceae endocarps have ridging on the surface of the endocarp and a basal pit opposite the open apex.

Uses
While not a chief staple in any large market product, Symplocaceae is used by some groups for specific purposes. One example of the uses of Symplocaceae is that the bark is used as a source of yellow dye in parts of South America. Another use of Symplocaceae is that the roots of some species of the family are used to make tonics.

Fossil record
The fossil record of Symplocaceae is well documented with fossils appearing in the current range as well as in Europe and further into North America. The fossil record does much to confirm the biogeographic connection between North America and East Asia which is already well established in the paleobotanical field. Much of the surviving fossil record is from pollen and the bony endocarps, but leaf imprints exist as well.

References

Ericales families
Ericales